East Radford Historic District is a national historic district located at Radford, Virginia. It encompasses 302 contributing buildings and 5 contributing structures in a mixed residential and commercial section of Radford, comprising most of the historic boundaries of the town of Central Depot.  It was developed between 1866 and 1916, and includes notable examples of Queen Anne and Colonial Revival style architecture. Notable buildings include the Shanks House, the
Ward-Carter House, Fraternity Building, Carson's Drug Store, Shumate Store, Alleghany Hotel, Simon Block, Bond Building, Williamson House, Maplehurst (the Arthur Roberts House), Dobbins Apartments, Belle Heth School (c. 1912), Grove Avenue Methodist Episcopal Church (1913), M. Jackson Hardware Company (1918), and Farmers' and Merchants' Bank.

It was listed on the National Register of Historic Places in 2000.

References

Historic districts on the National Register of Historic Places in Virginia
Queen Anne architecture in Virginia
Colonial Revival architecture in Virginia
Buildings and structures in Radford, Virginia
National Register of Historic Places in Radford, Virginia